Amanda Weltman (born 1979) is a South African theoretical physicist. She is known for co-authoring a paper proposing the "chameleon theory" to explain the existence of dark energy. She is currently a researcher at the University of Cape Town.

Education and early research
Amanda Weltman was first drawn to physics while she was an undergraduate student at the University of Cape Town. Describing her attraction to being a physicist, she stated that "understanding the way the Universe worked was just about the coolest job anyone could have."

In 2009, Weltman completed her Ph.D in theoretical physics at Columbia University in New York. She was supervised by theoretical physicist Brian Greene. She also did post-doctoral research at the University of Cambridge before returning to South Africa. Her post-doctoral work was with the physicist Stephen Hawking. She is currently part of a large research group at the University of Cape Town.

Personal life 
Weltman was born in 1979 in Cape Cod, Massachusetts, and travelled to South Africa with her parents when she was two months old. She spent her childhood in Johannesburg and Cape Town. She was a competitive gymnast as a child. 

She lives with her husband Jeff Murugan, who is a string theorist at the same university. She met him in 1999, and has two children with him. She has stated that she was glad to be brought up in a family without gender stereotypes, and that barriers that female scientists faced were particularly harmful when they occurred in the form of stereotypes that children were exposed to. She and her husband both take time off to care for their children, and frequently travel to conferences as a family.

Research and career
Weltman became known when she co-authored a 2004 paper titled "Chameleon Cosmology" with Justin Khoury, which proposed a theory to explain dark energy. She was a 24-year-old graduate student at Columbia University at the time. Dark energy is proposed as an explanation for the accelerating expansion of the universe. Khoury and Weltman proposed the existence of a new force that drove this expansion, which changed depending on the environment it was in. It would be weak when particles were densely packed together, and strong when they were far apart. Thus, the theory suggests that in regions where matter is relatively dense, the chameleon force is difficult to detect; but in empty regions of space, it acts to push bodies apart and expand the universe. The theory was such that it could not be tested for ten years after it was proposed; however, in 2014 experimenters at the University of Nottingham developed a method that had the potential to test the theory. The theory evolved by Khoury and Weltman has been described as leading to "entire sub-fields in cosmology and experimental physics." Her work has been described as a continuation of the work of Albert Einstein.

Awards and distinctions
 National Women in Science award for the Best Emerging Young Researcher in the Natural Sciences and Engineering, in 2009
 Meiring Naude Medal from the Royal Society of South Africa, in 2011
 NSTF-BHP Billiton, TW Kambule Award
 Silver Jubilee medal from the South African Institute of Physics
 The University of Cape Town Faculty of Science Young Researcher award, in 2010
 The College of Fellows Young Researcher award, in 2010
Selection to the Global Young Academy in 2018

References

External links
 Weltman discussing science in South Africa
 Weltman and Khoury's "Chameleon cosmology" paper

21st-century South African physicists
1979 births
Theoretical physicists
Living people
University of Cape Town alumni
Columbia Graduate School of Arts and Sciences alumni
South African cosmologists
Academic staff of the University of Cape Town
People from Johannesburg
Alumni of Herzlia High School